is a Japanese professional footballer who plays as a midfielder.

Club career

Klaksvíkar Ítróttarfelag
Matsunaga made his Betri deildin debut against Víkingur as his team drew 2-2. His team went on to win the 2019 Betri deildin.

Kalteng Putra
In 2019, Matsunaga signed for Kalteng Putra. He made his Liga 1 debut against Persebaya as his team drew 1-1. He scored his first goal for Kalteng scoring a long range goal against PSM Makassar as his team won 3-1.

Persipura Jayapura
In 2020, Matsunaga signed for Persipura. He made his debut for Persipura against PSIS Semarang as his team won 2-0.

Dordoi Bishkek
On 29 July 2022, Dordoi Bishkek announced the signing of Matsunaga on a contract until the end of the year.

Career statistics

Club

Notes

Honours
Klaksvíkar Ítróttarfelag
Betri deildin menn : 2019

References

1990 births
Living people
Japanese footballers
Japanese expatriate footballers
Association football midfielders
I Lyga players
Esiliiga players
Meistriliiga players
Faroe Islands Premier League players
Liga 1 (Indonesia) players
Kyrgyz Premier League players
FK Utenis Utena players
JK Tallinna Kalev players
KÍ Klaksvík players
Kalteng Putra F.C. players
Persipura Jayapura players
FC Dordoi Bishkek players
Japanese expatriate sportspeople in Lithuania
Expatriate footballers in Lithuania
Japanese expatriate sportspeople in Estonia
Expatriate footballers in Estonia
Japanese expatriate sportspeople in the Faroe Islands
Expatriate footballers in the Faroe Islands
Japanese expatriate sportspeople in Indonesia
Expatriate footballers in Indonesia
Japanese expatriate sportspeople in Kyrgyzstan
Expatriate footballers in Kyrgyzstan